Pirinçli is a village in the Beytüşşebap District of Şırnak Province in Turkey. The village is populated by Kurds of the Jirkî tribe and had a population of 511 in 2021.

The hamlets of Kavaklı and Kayaaltı are attached to Başaran.

References 

Villages in Beytüşşebap District
Kurdish settlements in Şırnak Province